Fresh FM is a network of radio stations in Nigeria, owned by Olayinka Joel Ayefele. Fresh FM stations are located in Abeokuta, Ado-Ekiti, Akure, Ibadan, Lagos, and Osogbo.

History
Programming began to Ibadan in 2015 and Abeokuta in 2018; the Ado-Ekiti station began broadcasting in 2020. The network expanded to Osogbo in October 2021 and to Lagos in 2022; a frequency for Ilorin has also been announced. Fresh FM is stationed in all the 6 SouthWest States of Nigeria with a vision for expansion to other regions in the nearest future.

References 

Radio stations in Nigeria
2015 establishments in Nigeria
Radio stations established in 2015